The Straw Man is a 1953 British crime film directed by Donald Taylor and starring Dermot Walsh, Clifford Evans and Lana Morris. Its storyline focuses on insurance fraud. It is based on the 1951 novel Straw Man by Doris Miles Disney.

It was set in and shot partly on location in Brighton. Film also took place at Wembley Studios. The film's sets were designed by Duncan Sutherland. It was released as a second feature by United Artists.

Cast

References

Bibliography
 Chibnall, Steve & McFarlane, Brian. The British 'B' Film. Palgrave MacMillan, 2009.

External links

1953 films
British crime films
1953 crime films
Films set in Brighton
Films shot at Wembley Studios
British black-and-white films
United Artists films
Films based on American novels
1950s English-language films
1950s British films